Ivanovka is a rural locality (a village) in Shabagishsky Selsoviet, Kuyurgazinsky District, Bashkortostan, Russia. The population was 107 as of 2010. There are 6 streets.

Geography 
Ivanovka is located 10 km southeast of Yermolayevo (the district's administrative centre) by road.

References 

Rural localities in Kuyurgazinsky District